The Archdeacon of Brechin was the only archdeacon in the diocese of Brechin, acting as a subordinate of the Bishop of Brechin. The archdeacon held the parish church of Strachan as a prebend from at least 1274.

List of archdeacons of Brechin
The following is a list of known historical archdeacons:

 Gregory, 1189 x 1198–1218
 Adam, 1242–1264
 William de Cresswell, 1284–1285 x 1294
 John de Kininmund, 1295–1298
 Hugh de Selkirk, c. 1309–1309 x 1320
 Laurence de Haddington, 1324 x 1327
 Dáibhidh de Mar, 1342–1344
 Domhnall de Mar, 1344–1349
 Laurence de Erroll, 1351–1352x1367
 William de Greenlaw, 1352–1353
 Laurence de Spens, 1363 x 1367–1369
 Stephen de Cellario, 1369–1383
 Cuthbert Henryson, 1383–1387
 Robert de Cardeny, 1391
 Thomas Stewart, 1391–1393
 William de Ramsey, 1395
 David de Idvy, 1397–1420 x 1425
 Henry Ogilvie, 1425
 Richard de Crag, 1426–1428
 Gilbert Forrester, 1425 x 1428–1462
 William Fechet, 1438
 David Haddow, x 1448
 David Stewart, 1448
 Richard Wylie, 1458–1467
 William Lawrie, 1467–1490
 David Pitcairn, 1500–1552
 James Pitcairn, 1551–1564 x 1565
 Arthur Erskine, 1563
 David Erskine, 1565–1611
 Thomas Burnett, 1608–1637

See also
 Bishop of Brechin

Notes

References
 
 

History of Angus, Scotland
Brechin
Christianity in Aberdeen
Christianity in Angus, Scotland
Christianity in Perth and Kinross